Anatrachyntis gymnocentra is a moth in the family Cosmopterigidae. It was described by Edward Meyrick in 1937 and is known from the Democratic Republic of the Congo.

References

Moths described in 1937
Anatrachyntis
Moths of Africa